Greisch is a village in the commune of Habscht, in western Luxembourg.  , the village had a population of 211.

Villages in Luxembourg
Septfontaines